Tapestry is a Canadian radio program, which airs Sunday afternoons on CBC Radio One featuring documentary and interview programming relating to spirituality, religion, philosophy and psychology. The program was created by producer Peter Skinner and host Peter Downie. The first episode was broadcast in September 1994. Downie was a former host of the CBC Television program Man Alive, which was also about spirituality, faith and religion. Skinner was an associate producer of Tapestry's predecessor on CBC Radio, Open House, as well as at Man Alive.

Peter Downie was the program's first host, for the 1994/95 and 95/96 seasons. The program's current host is Mary Hynes.

References

External links
 

CBC Radio One programs
Canadian documentary radio programs
Religious mass media in Canada
Religion and spirituality podcasts